The Tianfu Morning Post, or Tianfu Zaobao, also known as Tianfu Morning News, was a Chengdu-based Chinese-language metropolitan newspaper published in China.

Tianfu Morning Post was founded on June 1, 1999. On January 1, 2020, it ceased publication.

References

Defunct newspapers published in China
Publications established in 1999
1999 establishments in China
Publications disestablished in 2020